Harvey S. Borovetz is an American bioengineer currently a Distinguished Professor and former Chair of the Department of Bioengineering at the University of Pittsburgh and an Elected Fellow of the American Institute for Medical and Biological Engineering, Biomedical Engineering Society, Council on Arteriosclerosis, American Heart Association.

References

Year of birth missing (living people)
Living people
University of Pittsburgh faculty
American bioengineers
Carnegie Mellon University alumni
Brandeis University alumni
Fellows of the American Institute for Medical and Biological Engineering
Fellows of the Biomedical Engineering Society